Jazandar may refer to:
 Jazandar, Firuzeh
 Jazandar, Jowayin